The 1963 American Football League draft was held in Dallas on Saturday, December 1, 1962.

The Kansas City Chiefs drafted as the Dallas Texans, as their relocation would take place a few months later. With the first overall selection, they took Buck Buchanan, a defensive tackle from Grambling in Louisiana. The NFL draft was held two days later in Chicago.

Player selections

Round one

Round two

Round three

Round four

Round five

Round six

Round seven

Round eight

Round nine

Round ten

Round eleven

Round twelve

Round thirteen

Round fourteen

Round fifteen

Round sixteen

Round seventeen

Round eighteen

Round nineteen

Round twenty

Round twenty-one

Round twenty-two

Round twenty-three

Round twenty-four

Round twenty-five

Round twenty-six

Round twenty-seven

Round twenty-eight

Round twenty-nine

* This pick was considered a "Future" selection.

Notable undrafted players

See also
List of American Football League players
History of American Football League draft
List of professional American football drafts

References

External links
 1963 AFL Draft

1963
Draft
American Football League draft
American Football League draft
American football in Texas
Sports in Dallas
1960s in Dallas
Events in Dallas